Caribous-de-Jourdan Ecological Reserve is an ecological reserve of Quebec, Canada. It was established on August 19, 1994.

References

External links
 Official website from Government of Québec

Protected areas of Abitibi-Témiscamingue
Nature reserves in Quebec
Protected areas established in 1994
1994 establishments in Quebec